Sir Francis Hastings Charles Doyle, 2nd Baronet (21 August 1810 – 8 June 1888) was a British poet.

Biography
Doyle was born near Tadcaster, Yorkshire, to a military family which produced several distinguished officers, including his father, Major-General Sir Francis Hastings Doyle, 1st Baronet, who was created a baronet in 1828.  He succeeded to the baronetcy on the death of his father in 1839.

He was educated at Eton and Christ Church, Oxford, graduating with a degree in classics in 1831.

Studying law, he was called to the Bar in 1837, but his interestes were chiefly literary. Among his friends was William Gladstone, at whose marriage he assisted as best man, but in later life their political opinions widely differed.  Later he held various high fiscal appointments, becoming in 1869 Commissioner of Customs. In 1834 he published Miscellaneous Verses, followed by Two Destinies (1844), Oedipus, King of Thebes (1849), and Return of the Guards (1866).

He was elected in 1867 Professor of Poetry at Oxford. Doyle's best work is his ballads, which include The Red Thread of Honour, The Private of the Buffs, and The Loss of the Birkenhead. In his longer poems his genuine poetical feeling was not equalled by his power of expression, and much of his poetry is commonplace.

In 1869 some of the lectures he delivered were published in book form. One was his appreciation of William Barnes, and the essay on Newman's The Dream of Gerontius was translated into French. In 1886 he published his Reminiscences, full of records of the interesting people he had known.

Family
In 1844, he married Sydney Williams-Wynn, daughter of the MP Charles Williams-Wynn.

His eldest son Francis Granville Doyle (1846–1882) died of typhoid fever.

Doyle's daughter Mary married Charles Carmichael Lacaita, MP and botanist.

The baronetcy passed to a younger son Sir Everard Hastings Doyle, 3rd Baronet upon his death, and then later to his other son, Sir Arthur Havelock James Doyle, 4th Baronet.

References

External links
 

1810 births
1888 deaths
People from Tadcaster
People educated at Eton College
English barristers
Baronets in the Baronetage of the United Kingdom
Oxford Professors of Poetry
English male poets
19th-century English poets
19th-century English male writers
19th-century English lawyers